Ngari Burang Airport is a dual-use military-civilian airport under construction in Burang County, Ngari Prefecture, Tibet Autonomous Region. The airport is designed for 150,000 passengers and 600 tons of cargo annually.

Construction of the airport was approved in April 2021. It is located in a strategic location along China's southwestern border at just 400 km from New Delhi. The airport is scheduled to open towards the end of 2021.

See also 

 Ngari Gunsa Airport

References 

Airports in the Tibet Autonomous Region
Proposed airports in China
Ngari Prefecture